Terbanggi Besar–Pematang Panggang–Kayu Agung Toll Road, often abbreviated as Terpeka is a  toll road that connects Terbanggi Besar, Pematang Panggang, and Kayu Agung in the island of Sumatra,  Indonesia. This toll road is a network of Trans-Sumatra Toll Road, and connected to Bakauheni-Terbanggi Besar Toll Road and Kayu Agung–Palembang–Betung Toll Road.

Exits

See also

 Trans-Sumatra Toll Road

References

Toll roads in Sumatra
Transport in Lampung